Edward Clayton Eicher (December 16, 1878 – November 30, 1944) was a United States representative from Iowa, federal securities regulator and Chief Justice of the District Court of the United States for the District of Columbia. He was considered a consummate New Deal liberal.

Early life and education

Eicher was born on a farm near the unincorporated town of Noble, Iowa. His father, Benjamin Eicher, was a Mennonite bishop. His older brother, H. M. Eicher, was an assistant district attorney during the administration of President Grover Cleveland. Eicher attended public schools, Washington Academy in Washington, Iowa, and Morgan Park Academy in Morgan Park, Chicago, Illinois. In 1904 he graduated from the University of Chicago with a Bachelor of Philosophy degree. He studied law at the University of Chicago Law School.

Career 
Eicher was admitted to the bar in 1906 and briefly practiced in Washington, Iowa. He returned to the University of Chicago to serve as its assistant registrar. In 1909, he returned to Burlington, Iowa and served as an assistant attorney for the Chicago, Burlington and Quincy Railroad until 1918. In 1918, he resumed private practice as a partner in Livingston and Eicher in Washington, Iowa.

U.S. House of Representatives

Eicher was a delegate to the Democratic National Convention in 1932. In 1932, Eicher was elected as a Democrat to the United States House of Representatives from Iowa's 1st congressional district. Twice re-elected, he served from March 4, 1933, until December 2, 1938. He had withdrawn from the 1938 race for the Democratic nomination for his own seat. When his congressional career ended, Time magazine described him as "a wheelhorse in a pasture of mavericks".

Securities and Exchange Commission

As his final congressional term ended, Roosevelt appointed Eicher to the United States Securities and Exchange Commission. He was a member of the SEC from 1938 to 1942, serving as chair between 1941 and 1942.

Federal judicial service

New Dealers inside the Roosevelt Administration supported Eicher's wish to be chosen to fill one of two new seats on the United States Court of Appeals for the Eighth Circuit, but Iowa Senator Guy M. Gillette, who resented Eicher and Roosevelt for their unsuccessful efforts to purge him from Congress in 1938, stood in the way. Instead, no Iowan received either judgeship.

Eicher was nominated by President Franklin D. Roosevelt on December 30, 1941, to the Chief Justice seat on the District Court of the United States for the District of Columbia (now the United States District Court for the District of Columbia) vacated by Judge Alfred Adams Wheat. He was confirmed by the United States Senate on January 20, 1942, and received his commission on January 23, 1942. His service terminated on November 30, 1944, due to his death.

Death

Eicher died of a heart attack in Alexandria, Virginia, at age 65. At the time of his death, Eicher had presided for over seven months at the trial of 30 suspected Axis conspirators and sympathizers. Time magazine characterized the trial as "biggest and noisiest sedition trial in United States history", and reported that "no one in Washington doubted that a ludicrously undignified trial had hastened the death of a scrupulously dignified judge." Eicher's death caused a mistrial. After the war ended, the government chose not to prosecute again, and Judge Bolitha James Laws dismissed the charges against the defendants. He was interred in Woodlawn Cemetery in Washington, Iowa.

References

External links

 

 

1878 births
1944 deaths
Morgan Park Academy alumni
University of Chicago alumni
Members of the U.S. Securities and Exchange Commission
Judges of the United States District Court for the District of Columbia
United States district court judges appointed by Franklin D. Roosevelt
20th-century American judges
American Mennonites
People from Washington County, Iowa
Iowa lawyers
Virginia Democrats
Democratic Party members of the United States House of Representatives from Iowa
People from Washington, Iowa
Franklin D. Roosevelt administration personnel